The Weapons Squadrons are units of the United States Air Force, in most cases attached to the USAF Weapons School at Nellis Air Force Base. Each unit specializes in a particular type of combat aircraft.

List of Weapons Squadrons

See also
 United States Air Force Weapons School

See also
 List of United States Air Force squadrons

Weapons